Catherine Louise "Katey" Sagal (born January 19, 1954) is an American actress and singer. She is known for playing Peggy Bundy on Married... with Children (1987–1997), Leela on Futurama (1999–2003, 2008–2013, 2023), Cate Hennessy on 8 Simple Rules (2002–2005), Gemma Teller Morrow on the FX series Sons of Anarchy (2008–2014), for which she won the Golden Globe Award for Best Actress – Television Series Drama in 2011, Dr. Jones on Shameless (2018–2019), and Louise Goldufski-Conner on The Conners (2018–present).

Early life
Sagal was born on January 19, 1954, in Los Angeles, California, to a show business family with five children. Her mother, Sara Zwilling, was a singer (stage name Sara Macon), producer, and television writer who died of heart disease in 1975, and Sagal's father, Boris Sagal, worked as a television director. Her father was a Ukrainian-Jewish immigrant. Her mother had Amish ancestors. In 1977, Sagal's father married dancer/actress Marge Champion, a few years before his accidental death on the set of the miniseries World War III in 1981. Three of Sagal's four siblings are actors: her younger twin sisters, Jean and Liz Sagal and brother Joey Sagal; her other brother David Sagal is an attorney married to actress McNally Sagal. Sagal and her siblings grew up in Brentwood, Los Angeles.

Her godfather is sitcom producer and writer Norman Lear. In 2016, both Katey and Norman acknowledged that she was not only his goddaughter, but that he also introduced her parents to each other. Sagal has described herself as "culturally Jewish" but with no "formal religious experience."

Sagal graduated from Palisades High School. After graduation, she attended the California Institute of the Arts.

Musical career
Sagal started her career in show business as a singer and songwriter. In 1973, she worked as a backing vocalist for various singers, including Bob Dylan, Etta James, and Tanya Tucker. In 1976, while a member of The Group with No Name, she contributed to the album Moon over Brooklyn (on which she was credited as "Katie Sagal"). She was a member of Bette Midler's backup group The Harlettes in 1978, and again from 1982 to 1983.

During the filming of 1983's Valley Girl, Sagal was scheduled to sing at The Central. Her name can be seen in the schedule of upcoming acts, posted inside the door.

She performed backing vocals on the self-titled Gene Simmons solo album, the Molly Hatchet album Take No Prisoners, and on Olivia Newton-John's 1985 single "Soul Kiss." She performed the song "It's the Time for Love" that appears in the movie Silent Rage featuring Chuck Norris. Sagal also provided the vocals for "Loose Cannons," the theme song for the 1990 movie of the same name featuring Gene Hackman and Dan Aykroyd.

On April 19, 1994, Sagal released her first solo album, Well.... On June 1, 2004, she released her second album, Room. 

She has also contributed to the Sons of Anarchy soundtrack, working with its house band The Forest Rangers (Davey Faragher/bass, John Philipe Shenale(Phil Shenale)/keyboards, Billy Harvey/guitar-vocals, Michael Urbano/drums, Bob Thiele Jr./vocals-guitar) with songs that became part of its soundtrack albums (Songs of Anarchy: Music from Sons of Anarchy Seasons 1–4 Sons of Anarchy: Songs of Anarchy Vol. 2, Sons of Anarchy: Songs of Anarchy Vol. 3, Sons of Anarchy: Songs of Anarchy Vol. 4) and singles.

She worked with the band for her album Covered (2013). For their live performances The Forest Rangers have occasionally used the name The Reluctant Apostles.

"Mayans MC: Black is Black" single from Mayans M.C. was released in 2019 performed by Sagal and The Forest Rangers.

Acting career

One role was as a receptionist in the detective Columbo installment "Candidate for Crime," which was directed by her father. Sagal's first major role was as a newspaper columnist in the series Mary (1985–86) starring Mary Tyler Moore. This led to her being cast as Peggy Bundy on the sitcom Married... with Children (1987–1997); she portrayed the lower-class, sex-starved, lazy and free-spending wife of shoe salesman Al Bundy. The series ran for 11 years. It had been reported that Sagal brought her own red bouffant wig to audition for the role, and with the producers' approval, the look transitioned into the show. However, Sagal later explained that she had initially styled her own hair, then once the show took off, the producers began to invest in a wig.

After the end of Married... with Children, several more television films followed; Sagal also guest starred on the children's cartoon Recess as the voice of Spinelli's mother. In 1998, Matt Groening chose her to provide the character voice of the purple-haired mutant spaceship captain, Leela, in his science-fiction animated comedy Futurama. The show developed a cult following, but was cancelled after four seasons. However, syndication on Adult Swim and Comedy Central increased the show's popularity and led Comedy Central to commission a season of Futurama direct-to-DVD films, which the network later retransmitted as a 16-episode fifth season. She reprised her role as Leela in these films, and in the sixth season that began airing June 24, 2010. The series ended its run on Comedy Central in 2013.  

Sagal guest-starred as Edna Hyde, Steven Hyde's mother, in three episodes of That '70s Show. She starred in the short-lived NBC sitcom Tucker in 2000.

Sagal was cast as the wife of John Ritter in the sitcom 8 Simple Rules for Dating My Teenage Daughter in 2002. Ritter had completed only three episodes of the second season before his death, and the show was cancelled in 2005 after its third season.

In 2005 and 2006, Sagal made two appearances on Lost as Helen Norwood. In 2007, she had a role in the season finale of The Winner as Glen Abbot's former teacher, with whom Glen has his first sexual experience.

From 2008 to 2014, Sagal starred as Gemma Teller Morrow on the TV show Sons of Anarchy, whose creator, Kurt Sutter, she had married in 2004, four years before the series premiered. In January 2009, Sagal reunited with David Faustino (who had played her son Bud Bundy in Married... with Children) for an episode of Faustino's show Star-ving. In 2010, she appeared twice more on Lost. In 2009, she starred in the film House Broken with Danny DeVito. In 2010, she returned to the stage in Randy Newman's musical Harps & Angels.

In 2013, Sagal had a cameo on Glee as Nancy Abrams, Artie Abrams' mother. She co-starred in Pitch Perfect 2, released in 2015, as the mother of Hailee Steinfeld's character. She next appeared in the biography drama film Bleed for This, as the mother of Vinny Pazienza.

On September 9, 2014, Sagal received a star on the Hollywood Walk of Fame; most of the Married ... with Children cast – including Ed O'Neill, Christina Applegate, and David Faustino – were present to celebrate the actor's recognition.

On September 20, 2016, Sagal appeared on The Big Bang Theory as Susan, the mother of Penny (Kaley Cuoco). She had previously played the mother of Cuoco's character on 8 Simple Rules.

Sagal was also a series regular on the CBS sitcom Superior Donuts from 2017 to 2018. She also appeared on Shameless as Frank's latest, crazy lover.

Most recently she has appeared in a recurring role as Dan Conner's love interest, Louise Goldufski, in The Conners after Roseanne Barr's firing and a cameo appearance in the Netflix series Dead to Me in season 2, episodes 9 and 10 as Judy Hale's (Linda Cardellini) estranged, emotionally abusive, incarcerated mother Eleanor Hale.

In 2018 she had a cameo appearance in the crime drama series Mayans M.C. as Gemma Tellor Morrow reprising her role from the Sons of Anarchy series.

In 2021, Sagal played the lead role of Annie "Rebel" Bello in the ABC drama series Rebel, which was written by Krista Vernoff. ABC cancelled Rebel after ten episodes.

On February 9, 2022, Hulu announced that streaming service would be reviving Futurama for a 20-episode run set to premiere in 2023 with Sagal returning as the voice of Leela.

Activism
In June 2016, the Human Rights Campaign released a video in tribute to the victims of the 2016 Orlando nightclub shooting; in the video, Sagal and others told the stories of the people killed there.

Personal life
Sagal was married to musician Freddie Beckmeier, from 1978 to 1981 and Jack White, from 1993 to 2000. She married writer-producer Kurt Sutter in a private ceremony on October 2, 2004, at their home in the Los Angeles neighborhood of Los Feliz. They have a daughter, Esmé Louise, born in 2007 through a surrogate.

In 1991, while working on Married... with Children, Sagal learned that she was pregnant. This was unexpected, so the pregnancy was written into the storyline of the show. In October 1991, however, she had to have an emergency caesarean section in her seventh month of pregnancy, ending in the stillbirth of a daughter. The pregnancy on the show was then treated as a "dream sequence," which was mentioned only briefly at the end of the episode "Al Bundy, Shoe Dick." Sagal and White eventually had two children—a daughter, Sarah Grace, in 1994, and a son, Jackson James White, in 1996. The writers of Married... with Children deliberately did not write Sagal's two later pregnancies into the show due to the earlier stillbirth, opting instead to write off her absences in a subplot in which Peg is traveling the world to reunite her parents. In scenes where Peg was shown, Sagal had her midsection obscured, such as in a taxi or at a craps table in Las Vegas and was often seen or heard talking to family members over the phone.

One after effect of Sagal's having lost her stillborn daughter was the inspiration to write the lyrics for "(You) Can't Hurry the Harvest". She recorded this song on her debut album, Well..., which was released in April 1994.

She was the subject of an episode of the television genealogy series Who Do You Think You Are? in 2016.

On October 14, 2021, Sagal was hit by a car while crossing a street in Los Angeles. She was transported by ambulance to a local hospital where she was released the next day.

Filmography

Film

Television

Discography

Albums

Awards and nominations

References

External links

 
 Katey Sagal at Rotten Tomatoes
 Katey Sagal cast bio on The WB

1954 births
Living people
20th-century American actresses
21st-century American actresses
Actresses from Los Angeles
American women pop singers
American women singer-songwriters
Jewish American actresses
Jewish women singers
American people of Ukrainian-Jewish descent
American television actresses
American voice actresses
Best Drama Actress Golden Globe (television) winners
Participants in American reality television series
Virgin Records artists
California Institute of the Arts alumni
Activists from California
People from Brentwood, Los Angeles
Harlettes members
21st-century American women singers
21st-century American singers
21st-century American Jews
20th-century American women singers
20th-century American singers
20th-century American Jews
The Group with No Name members
Women who experienced pregnancy loss
Sons of Anarchy
Singers from Los Angeles